Yaumatei Ferry Pier (1924–1933) was a ferry pier at the junction of Public Square Street and Ferry Street (now Prosperous Garden) in Yau Ma Tei, Kowloon, Hong Kong. The seaside outside Ferry Street is now reclaimed.

Another pier, at the other end of the company's main route, in Central, was known as HYF pier, for 'Hong Kong and Yaumatei Ferry'.

History 
Since the Hong Kong and Yaumati Ferry Company began service between Yau Ma Tei and Central in 1923, Yaumatei Ferry Pier started operation on 1 January 1924. In 1933, the Ferry Company developed its vehicular ferry service, but the pier was too small for vehicular ferries. So the pier was replaced by Jordan Road Ferry Pier in Jordan west.

References

Demolished piers in Hong Kong
1924 establishments in Hong Kong
1933 disestablishments in Hong Kong
Yau Ma Tei
Victoria Harbour